Martine Schon (born 7 December 1992) is a Luxembourger footballer who plays as a forward for Dames Ligue 1 club AS Wincrange and the Luxembourg women's national team.

International career
Schon made her senior debut for Luxembourg on 20 September 2020 during a 0–3 friendly loss against Bulgaria.

References

1992 births
Living people
Women's association football forwards
Luxembourgian women's footballers
Luxembourg women's international footballers